Audits of Greece's public finances during the period 2009–2010 were undertaken by the EU authorities. Since joining the Euro zone, Greece's public finances markedly deviated from the debt and deficit limits set by Stability and Growth Pact.

Against this backdrop, a 2004 external audit exposed creative accounting practices understating the problem, putting the EU authorities on alert thereafter. In 2009, the Greek government-debt crisis developed, and the EU authorities suspected again a lack of credibility in its book keeping, hence the audits.

This caused political and financial market turmoil. For instance, it reignited a controversy about Greece's off-market swaps contracted with Goldman Sachs in 2001. The  accounts for the period 2006–2009, including debt and deficits levels, were regularized. The lasting effects were institutional changes in Greece and at the EU level in the area of fiscal data. There remains, nonetheless, an ongoing controversy about methodological issued that affected the extent of revisions.

Inside the reports 

As part of an excessive deficit procedure (EDP), the Greek authorities submitted to Eurostat, in October 2009, unusually high upward revisions of the deficit and debt data for the period 2005–2008. ECOFIN commissioned an audit, known as an 'EDP methodological visit'. It began in November 2009, and its results were published in a report dated 8 January 2010.

According to this report, Eurostat could not validate Greece's fiscal data, exposing Greece's sub par statistical ability and accountability, relative to other member states. This came despite a reinforced EU legal framework for fiscal data following the episode of the 2004 Greek financial audit. At the request of ECOFIN, Eurostat followed up with a series of EDP methodological visits during 2010, in cooperation with the Greek authorities. As part of this initiative, the Hellenic Statistical Authority (ELSTAT) was established as an independent authority subject to the control of the Greek Parliament. EDP notification tables are required to be published in April and October by each member state.

In the case of Greece, the April 2010 notification contained revised fiscal data for 2006–2009, but with remaining reservations in these areas: statistical classification of public corporations, off-market swaps, social security funds, unaudited budget amounts and payables. These were addressed in the October 2010 EDP notification, a significant revision. However, residual uncertainties, notably for the year 2009, called for another visit, known as "extended". Its outcome is the November 2010 EDP notification (outside the statutory schedule), which is published in a comprehensive report concluding that "revised data for 2006–2009 are sufficiently reliable for EDP purposes". An accompanying information note was published around the same time.

We use the convention that a positive deficit means a negative government balance, and conversely The following abbreviations (shown in parenthesis) are used: local government (LG) and central government (CG) and social security funds (SSF). These add up to a total known as "General government". We use the convention that 1,000.1 means one thousand and one tenth.

The variation in the published values of general government debt (the total), between the April and the November EDP notifications, is entirely attributable to CG. Hence only the breakdown for the deficit is reproduced below.

Notes

References

External links 
 Excessive deficit procedure, Eurostat
 
 
 
 

Economic history of Greece
Greek government-debt crisis
Government audit
Corruption in Greece
2009 in Greek politics
2010 in Greek politics
Finance in Greece